Bensley may refer to:

Surname
Benjamin Arthur Bensley (1875–1934), Canadian mammalogist specialising in marsupials
Bill Bensley (1959), American architect
Harry Bensley, English man who attempted to walk around the world
Peter Bensley, Australian actor
Robert Bensley (ca. 1740–1817), English actor
Sir William Bensley, 1st Baronet, director of the East India Company

Location
Bensley, Virginia